An ENI number (European Number of Identification or European Vessel Identification Number) is a registration for ships capable of navigating on inland European waters. It is a unique, eight-digit identifier that is attached to a hull for its entire lifetime, independent of the vessel's current name or flag.

ENI was introduced by the Inland Transport Committee of the United Nations Economic Commission for Europe in their meeting on 11–13 October 2006 in Geneva. It is based on the Rhine Vessel certification system previously used for ships navigating the Rhine, and is comparable to the IMO ship identification number.

Format
The ENI number consists of eight Arabic numerals. The first three digits identify the competent authority where the number is assigned (see "List of prefixes" below) and the last five digits are a serial number.

Ships which have a vessel number in accordance to the Rhine Inspection Rules receive an ENI beginning with "0" and followed by the seven digit Rhine number. A vessel which has been issued an IMO number may only receive an ENI number if it has appropriate certifications for inland water travel. Its ENI will begin with "9" followed by its seven digit IMO number.

The ENI number is transmitted by Inland-Automatic Identification System transponders.

Requirements
Not all European vessels are required to carry an ENI number. If a vessel is issued an ENI, this number must be displayed on the sides and stern of the vessel.

List of prefixes

References

External links

Ship identification numbers
Country codes
Ship registration
Water transport in Europe